The Canadian Mining Hall of Fame was conceived by Maurice R. Brown as a way to honor Canada's mine finders and builders, in recognition of accomplishments by leaders in the Canadian mining industry.

The Hall was established in 1988; in 2022 it had 200 members.

Locations
The Hall has five physical locations.

Toronto
The University of Toronto hosts the original Hall on the ground floor of the historic Mining Building on campus. The Hall contains plaques of polished Canadian granite with photos and descriptions of the Members from 1989-2008.

The Royal Ontario Museum contains an interactive exhibit of the Hall on the second floor, within the Teck Suite of Galleries.

Elliot Lake
The Hall virtual exhibit is a part of the Mining Museum in the Lester B. Pearson Civic Centre in Elliot Lake.

Ottawa 
The Hall's virtual exhibit opened in the Canadian Museum of Nature in 2012, as part of Phase 2 of the Vale Earth Gallery.

British Columbia 
The Britannia Mine Museum, located at the site of the former Britannia copper mine also features the Hall's virtual exhibit.

Nomination guidelines
The candidate must have demonstrated outstanding lifetime achievements to the benefit of the Canadian minerals industry in one or more categories of achievement. The individual should be retired and have reached the age of 65 years. Nominations of individuals may be made by individuals, firms or organizations through one of the Hall's Sponsors or Associates.

Categories of achievement
Exploration
Discovered a large deposit or a large number of significant deposits
Introduced a new exploration technique
Overcoming of exceptional obstacles in discovering a significant deposit
Building a corporation
Technical contribution
Development of a technology or operation method that profoundly impacted the industry
Provision of geoscience data or scientific knowledge.
Supporting contribution
External support for the industry through education, policy or communication
Mining in society
Outstanding achievement in bridging the business goals of the industry with those of Canadian society

Inductees
Frederick R. Archibald
P. Jerry Asp
Hector Authier
Alex G. Balogh
Anthony R. Barringer
Ross J. Beaty
Pierre Beauchemin
Archibald M. Bell
Benjamin Taylor Bell
John Paris Bickell
Selwyn G. Blaylock
Stewart Lynn "Stu" Blusson
Robert W. Boyle
Matthew James Boylen
John Ross Bradfield
Peter M.D. Bradshaw
Carroll "Chuck" Brawner
J. Keith Brimacombe
William Guy Brissenden
Eldon Brown
Maurice Russell Brown
Peter M. Brown
Johannes "Joe" Brummer
Bernard O. Brynelsen
David G. Burchell
Neil Campbell
Côme Carbonneau
George Carmack
Kate Carmack
James E.C. Carter
Dawson "Tagish" Charlie
Frederick Connell
John Convey
Marsh A. Cooper
F. Dale Corman
Ernest "Ernie" Craig
George B. Cross
Walter Curlook
Alexander Stewart Dadson
Ernest J. Darragh
C. Stanley Davidson
Nathanael V. Davis
Duncan R. Derry
Randolph Diamond
Robert Dickinson
Patricia Dillon
A.O. Dufresne
Hugo Dummett
Georges H. Dumont
David Elliott
Richard J. Ennis
Joseph Errington
Graham Farquharson
Charles E. Fipke
James M. Franklin
Horace Fraser
Robert Friedland
Robert A. Gannicott
Neil George
Richard Geren
Louis Gignac
James Edward Gill
James W. (Jim) Gill
Ned Goodman
James R. Gordon
Dr. Donald "Digger" Gorman
Gerald Grandey
Bruce J. Grierson
Arthur Thomas Griffis
Oliver Hall
Robert Hallbauer
Phillip G. Hallof
John Hammell
John A. Hansuld
James Merritt Harrison
Gerald G. Hatch
Herbert E.T. Haultain
Tom Hebert
Robert Henderson
Joseph H. Hirshhorn
Donald M. Hogarth
Benny Hollinger
Walter Holyk
Edmund Horne
H. H. "Spud" Huestis
Robert "Bob" Hunter
Richard W. Hutchinson
Robert John Isaacs
William Fleming James
William (Bill) James
Maureen C. Jensen
William Gladstone Jewitt
Franc Joubin
Robert Jowsey
Norman Bell Keevil
Norman B. Keevil
Roland Kenneth Kilborn
Michael J. KnuckeyAlbert Koffman
John Kostuik
Alan Kulan
Gilbert LaBine
Adolphe La Prairie
Fred La Rose
Pierre Lassonde
Thayer Lindsley
Sir William Logan
Egil H. Lorntzsen
Terry MacGibbon
John MacIsaac
Phillip John Mackey
Vladimir Nicolaus Mackiw
Viola R. MacMillan
Skookum Jim (Keish) Mason
John Williams McBean
James McCrea
James J. McDougall
Rob McEwen
Sandy McIntyre (formerly Alexander Oliphant)
James H. McKinley
Donald A. McLeod
Jack McOuat
W. Austin McVeigh
Brian K. G. Meikle
Bernard M. Michel
Charles E. Michener
Chester F. Millar
Alfred E. Miller
Willet Green Miller
R. G. K. Morrison
Alex Mosher
Peter Munk
James Y. Murdoch
Mike Muzylowski
Ronald K. Netolitzky
James Paul Norrie
Sir Harry Oakes
Stephen P. Ogryzlo
James C. O'Rourke
Ralph D. Parker
Norman R. Paterson
Norman C. Pearce and Richard Pearce
Paul Penna
Murray Pezim
Franklin G.T. Pickard
Lloyd Montgomery Pidgeon
Richard Porritt
Alfred Powis
Robert Quartermain
Mark Rebagliati
Louis Renzoni
Joseph Arlington Retty
 Kate Rice
 Peter Risby
Walter J. Riva
David S. Robertson
Stephen Roman
Harry L. Roscoe
William S. Row
Edgar A. Scholz
Seymour Schulich
Stephen D. Scott
Harold O. Seigel
Roman Shklanka
Eberhard (Ebe) Scherkus
John D. Simpson
Robert M. Smith
Franklin K. Spragins
Karl Springer
Robert Crooks Stanley
Arthur W. Stollery
Ian Telfer
D. Grenville Thomas
James Edgar Thomson
David A. Thompson
Edward G. Thompson
John Fairfield Thompson
Jules Timmins
Noah A. Timmins
Joseph B. Tyrrell
Mary Edith Tyrrell
Mervyn Upham
Steve Vaughn
Ossian Walli
Victor Wansbrough
Harry Verney Warren
Bert Wasmund
Mackenzie Iles Watson
Murray Edmund Watts
Arthur W. White
Harold "Hank" Williams
John Williamson
Jack Wilson
John Tuzo Wilson
Harold Wright
William Henry Wright
John Zigarlick, Jr.

References

Inductees 2007- Press release
Canadian Mining Hall of Fame, "Inductees 2007 - 2010". October 26, 2017.
Canadian Mining Hall of Fame, "Inductees 2011 - 2014". October 25, 2017.
Canadian Mining Hall of Fame, "Canadian Mining Hall of Fame to induct four new members", January 15, 2014. Retrieved October 25, 2017.
Canadian Mining Hall of Fame, "Inductees 2015 - 2018". Retrieved October 25, 2017.
Canadian Mining Hall of Fame, "Canadian Mining Hall of Fame Welcomes Four Inductees for 2018", October 16, 2017. Retrieved October 25, 2017.

External links
 Canadian Mining Hall of Fame website.
 Canadian Mining Hall of Fame website (archived September 13, 2017).
Archival papers of Hebert Edward Terrick Haultain, inductee, held at the University of Toronto Archives and Records Management Services

Mining in Canada
Mining organizations
Halls of fame in Canada
Mining museums in Canada
University of Toronto
Organizations established in 1988
1988 establishments in Ontario